The 2002 Turkmenistan Higher League (Ýokary Liga) season was the tenth season of Turkmenistan's professional football league. Nine teams competed in 2002.

Results

External links
 

Ýokary Liga seasons
Turk
Turk
1